Volkmar Kleinert (born 20 September 1938) is a German actor. He studied at the Theaterhochschule Leipzig and appeared in more than one hundred films since 1959.

Filmography

References

External links 

1938 births
Theaterhochschule Leipzig alumni
Living people
German male film actors